Marózka is a river of Poland. It flows into the river Łyna close to its outflow from the lake Kiernoz Wielki near Kurki.

Rivers of Poland
Rivers of Warmian-Masurian Voivodeship